The King of In Between is a solo album by Garland Jeffreys.  It was released in 2011 by Big Lake Records and self-produced. Lou Reed provided backing vocals on one track on the album, "The Contortionist".

Critical reception
The King of In Between has a score of 79/100 on Metacritic, indicating "generally favorable reviews".

Track listing
All tracks composed by Garland Jeffreys
 "Coney Island Winter" - 3:50
 "I'm Alive" - 4:01
 "Streetwise" - 4:48
 "The Contortionist" - 3:53
 "All Around the World" - 4:38
 "'Til John Lee Hooker Calls Me" - 4:02
 "Love Is Not a Cliché" - 3:27
 "Rock and Roll Music" - 2:56
 "The Beautiful Truth" - 4:04
 "Roller Coast Town" - 3:06
 "In God's Waiting Room" - 3:59
 "Rock On" (unlisted bonus track) - 3:18

Personnel
Garland Jeffreys - vocals, acoustic guitar (tracks: 1, 2, 5, 11, 12, 13)
Larry Campbell - electric guitar (tracks: 3, 4, 6); acoustic and electric guitar, mandolin, violin, string arrangements  (tracks: 12, 13); guitar solos (tracks: 4, 8); rhythm guitar (track: 9); revelator guitar (track: 11)
Duncan Sheik - acoustic and electric guitar, sonic orchestration (track: 2)
Duke Levine - electric guitar (tracks: 3, 4, 6, 8, 12, 13);  wah-wah electric guitar, special effects (track: 9)
Hugh McCracken (tracks: 2), Junior Marvin (tracks: 5, 10) - electric guitar
Mark Bosch - acoustic, electric and slide guitar (tracks: 2, 7); electric guitar, organ, piano (tracks: 1, 7)
Alan Freedman - acoustic guitar (track: 12); electric guitar (tracks: 2, 5, 7, 10)
Jeremy Chatzky (tracks: 5, 10), John Conte (tracks: 1, 7), Mike Merritt (tracks: 3, 4, 6, 8, 9,12,13), Pino Palladino (track: 2) - bass
Brian Mitchell - keyboards (tracks: 12, 13); Hammond organ (tracks: 3, 4, 9), piano (tracks: 4, 8)
George Kouao - keyboards (tracks: 5, 10)
Rich Pagano (tracks: 1, 7), Steve Goulding (tracks: 5, 10), Steve Jordan (tracks: 2 to 4, 6, 8, 9, 12, 13) - drums
Jerry Johnson - tenor saxophone (tracks: 5, 10)
Clark Gayton - trombone (tracks: 5, 10)
Savannah Jeffreys, Vaneese Thomas - additional vocals (track: 4)
Cindy Mizelle (tracks: 5, 13), Lou Reed (track: 4), Vaneese Thomas (track: 8) - backing vocals

References

External links 
 AMG review

2011 albums
Albums produced by Larry Campbell (musician)
Garland Jeffreys albums